Phil Hall may refer to:

Phil Hall (journalist) (born 1955), British newspaper editor and PR consultant
Phil Hall (poet) (born 1953), Canadian poet
Phil Hall (US writer) (born 1964), American writer
Phil Hall (author) (born 1962), British editor of comics
Philip Hall (1904–1982), English mathematician
Philip Hall, an eponymous fictional character in the Bette Green novel Philip Hall Likes Me, I Reckon Maybe
Philip Baker Hall (1931–2022), American actor
Philip Hall (diplomat) (born 1967), British diplomat